Trevor Roberts (25 February 1942 – June 1972) was a Welsh professional footballer who played as a goalkeeper. He made a total of 207 appearances in the Football League for Southend United and Cambridge United before dying of a brain tumour at the age of 30.

Career
Roberts began his career as a youth player at Liverpool, combining his playing there with studying for a degree in geography at Liverpool University, He then played in the Football League for Southend United and Cambridge United between 1965 and 1972, making 207 appearances.

Death
In 1968 Roberts recovered from lung cancer. In February 1972 he was admitted to hospital with a brain tumour and died in June 1972 in a nursing home, at the age of 30.

References

1942 births
1972 deaths
People from Caernarfon
Sportspeople from Gwynedd
Welsh footballers
Liverpool F.C. players
Southend United F.C. players
Cambridge United F.C. players
English Football League players
Association football goalkeepers
Deaths from brain cancer in England